Super Sunday may refer to:

Sports
Super Sunday or "Super Bowl Sunday", the Sunday of the National Football League's championship game in the United States, the Super Bowl
Super Sunday or Ford Super Sunday, a live Sunday afternoon Premier League football broadcast on Sky Sports in the UK

Other
Super Sunday (TV series), a 1980s American cartoon anthology series from Sunbow and Marvel Productions featuring Hasbro characters
Super Sunday (phone-a-thon), the annual phone-a-thon fundraising drives held by Jewish federations throughout North America, on various Sundays of the year.
Super Sunday (computer game), a 1986 video game published by Avalon Hill for the Apple II and Commodore 64
"Super Sunday", in New Orleans, refers to one of the annual celebrations staged by Mardi Gras Indian tribes, and held in Uptown, Downtown, or the west bank of New Orleans

See also
Super Soul Sunday, an American daytime television talk show hosted by Oprah Winfrey